Rhys John Llewellyn Duggan (born 31 July 1972) is a former New Zealand rugby union player. A halfback, Duggan represented Bay of Plenty and Waikato at a provincial level and the Hurricanes, Highlanders and Chiefs in Super Rugby. He played one match for the New Zealand national side, the All Blacks, a test against Italy in the 1999 Rugby World Cup. Of Ngāti Manawa descent, Duggan played for New Zealand Māori between 1996 and 2002.

References

1972 births
Living people
Rugby union players from Rotorua
People educated at Wesley College, Auckland
New Zealand rugby union players
New Zealand international rugby union players
Hurricanes (rugby union) players
Highlanders (rugby union) players
Chiefs (rugby union) players
Waikato rugby union players
Bay of Plenty rugby union players